Orsamus Benajah Matteson (August 28, 1805 – December 22, 1889) was a U.S. Representative from New York.

Early life
Orsamus Benajah Matteson was born on August 28, 1805, in a log cabin in Verona, New York. He was one of eleven children. He attended the common schools and studied law in Utica, New York, alongside Horatio Seymour and was admitted to the bar in 1830.

Career
Matteson commenced practice in Utica. He had law practices with William J. Bacon, P. Sheldon Root and Charles A. Doolittle. He served as the first city attorney of Utica in 1834 and 1836. He also served as state supreme court commissioner. He was an unsuccessful candidate for election in 1846 to the Thirtieth Congress.

Matteson was elected as a Whig to the Thirty-first Congress (March 4, 1849 – March 3, 1851). He was an unsuccessful candidate for reelection in 1850 to the Thirty-second Congress. Matteson was elected to the Thirty-third Congress and reelected as an Opposition Party candidate to the Thirty-fourth Congress and began service on March 4, 1853 where he served as chairman of the Committee on the District of Columbia.

He resigned on February 27, 1857, just before a recommendation of censure could be passed by the House for allegations of bribery and corruption concerning a Minnesota land bill.  He was also accused of publicly stating that a majority of the US House was purchasable, which led to his decision to resign. Matteson was elected as a Republican to the Thirty-fifth Congress (March 4, 1857 – March 3, 1859).

He was interested in a scheme for the construction of the St. Mary's Ship Canal and he engaged in lumbering and iron manufacturing and in the acquisition of large tracts of land. Matteson engaged in different business enterprises later in life and would die comparatively poor.

Personal life
Matteson married Mary Hurlburt of Utica in 1830. They had two children, Henry Clay and a daughter who married Colonel George Pomeroy of Utica.

Matteson was one of the congressman that got sick from the National Hotel disease in 1857. Matteson died in Utica, New York, on December 22, 1889. He was interred in Forest Hill Cemetery in Utica.

References

Sources

1805 births
1889 deaths
People from Verona, New York
New York (state) Whigs
Whig Party members of the United States House of Representatives
Opposition Party members of the United States House of Representatives from New York (state)
Republican Party members of the United States House of Representatives from New York (state)
Censured or reprimanded members of the United States House of Representatives
New York (state) lawyers
19th-century American politicians
19th-century American lawyers
Burials at Forest Hill Cemetery (Utica, New York)